The Suez Stadium is a multi-purpose stadium located in Suez, Egypt.  It is used mostly for football and serves as the home stadium of Asmant El-Suweis and Petrojet SC.  The stadium has a capacity of 27,000 people. It opened in 1990.

2019 Africa Cup of Nations
The stadium was one of the venues for the 2019 Africa Cup of Nations. The following eight games were played at the stadium during the competition:

References

Football venues in Egypt
Multi-purpose stadiums in Egypt
Sports venues completed in 1990
1990 establishments in Egypt
2019 Africa Cup of Nations stadiums